The 2010 Sun Belt Conference men's basketball tournament was held in Hot Springs, Arkansas from March 18 to March 29. Eight Games including the Semi-finals and final were played at Summit Arena and four other games were played at Convention Center Court in Hot Springs, Arkansas. All 13 Sun Belt teams participated in the tournament and there seedings are based on their conference record. North Texas was the tournament champion and received an automatic bid to the 2010 NCAA Men's Division I Basketball Tournament.

Bracket

Asterisk denotes game ended in overtime.

Sun Belt Conference men's basketball tournament
Tournament
Sun Belt Conference men's basketball tournament
Sun Belt Conference men's basketball tournament